Arthur Hughes (23 November 1927 – 31 October 2015) was a Scottish professional footballer who played as an inside forward.

Hughes died in Medway on 31 October 2015, at the age of 87.

References

1927 births
2015 deaths
People from Linlithgow
Scottish footballers
Association football inside forwards
Jeanfield Swifts F.C. players
Notts County F.C. players
Nottingham Forest F.C. players
Canterbury City F.C. players
Grimsby Town F.C. players
Gillingham F.C. players
Dover F.C. players
English Football League players